Alia Mamdouh (also spelled Aliyah Mamduh) (born 1944) is an Iraqi novelist, author, and journalist living in exile in Paris, France. 

She won the 2004 Naguib Mahfouz Medal for Literature for her novel The Loved Ones. She is most known for her widely acclaimed and translated book Naphtalene, originally written in Arabic. Her 2020 novel The Tank was shortlisted for the International Prize for Arabic Fiction.

Mamdouh was born in Baghdad, Iraq in 1944. After completing her degree in psychology from the University of Mustansiriya in 1971, while at the same time working as editor-in-chief of Al Rasid magazine and editor of al-Fikr al-mua’sir magazine, Mamdouh decided to move in 1982. She has since lived in Beirut, Morocco, and finally Paris, where she currently lives. She continues to write. 

She cites Albert Camus as an influence.

Works
 Overture for Laughter (short stories) (1973)
 Habbat-al-Naphatalin / Naphtalene: A Novel of Baghdad (Original Arabic  published by al-Hay'ah al-Masriah Al-Amah lil-Kitab, Cairo, 1986; Arabic translation published by Garnet in 1986 by Peter Theroux) 
 ftitahiya lil Dahik (Prelude to Laughter) (1971)
 Hawamish ilal Sayyida Ba (Notes to Mrs. B) (1973)
 Layla wa Al-Dhib (Laila and the Wolf) (1981)
 Habbat Al-Naftalin (Mothballs) (1986)
 Al-Wala (Passion) (1993)
 Al-Ghulama (The Maiden) (2000)
 The Loved Ones (2003)
 Al-Mahbubat (2005)
 The Tank (2020)
Mamdouh writes in Arabic, and two of her works have been translated to English: Naphtalene (translated by Peter Thereoux) and The Loved Ones (translated by Marilyn Booth). 

Most Mamdouh's books are about Iraq, though she has lived abroad for decades. On the idea of writing about her country while outside of it, she has stated: "Every day I look at my country’s situation and depict its virtues and delights, atrocities and grievances in each novel....I did not leave it, and so it did not leave me."

Her first novel, Naphtalene, published soon after she left Iraq, tells the story of a young girl growing up in Baghdad in the 1940s and 1950s.

See also 

 Iraqi literature
 Full list of winners and nominees for the International Prize for Arabic Fiction

References

External links
An Excerpt from Alia Mamdouh’s The Tank
Article on Alia Mamdouh 
Review on The Loved Ones

1944 births
Living people
Iraqi writers
Iraqi women writers
Iraqi emigrants to France
Recipients of the Naguib Mahfouz Medal for Literature
Writers from Baghdad
Iraqi journalists
Iraqi people of Syrian descent
Al-Mustansiriya University alumni